Harry Slochower (September 1, 1900 – May 11, 1991) was an Austrian-American scholar, philosopher and psychoanalyst.

Biography 
Slochower was born Hersch Zloczower in Bukowina, formerly part of Austria and now Romania. He arrived in the United States on the S. S. Frankfurt in October 1913, joining his parents who had arrived in February 1911. He grew up in the Bronx and studied philosophy and German at the City College of New York, graduating in 1923. He also studied at the universities of Berlin, Munich and Heidelberg, before receiving his PhD from Columbia for a book on Richard Dehmel. He was made a Guggenheim Fellow in 1929 for his study on the "infiltration of Schopenhauer's pessimism into German literature".

From 1924, Slochower taught German and English (for immigrants) at various schools in New York. From 1928 to 1952, Slochower taught German literature, comparative literature and philosophy at Brooklyn College in New York. In 1952, Slochower invoked the Fifth Amendment, refusing to answer a Congressional committee whether he was a member of the Communist Party. He was fired from his teaching post and then sued the college. The Supreme Court ruled, in 1956, that he had been "denied due process" and Slochower was reinstated and given back pay of $40,000, before being suspended again for the charge of lying before the Senate committee. Following this, he resigned his professorship and then worked as a psychoanalyst. From 1964 to 1989 he taught at The New School for Social Research in New York.

Slochower died at the age of 90, in Brooklyn.

Works 
Slochower engaged primarily with psychoanalytic literary interpretations. His works include Three Ways of Modern Man (1937), Thomas Mann's Joseph Story: An Interpretation (1938) and No Voice is Wholly Lost (1945). He also contributed to various philosophical, literary and psychoanalytic journals. Slochower was president of the Association for Applied Psychoanalysis and, from 1964 until his death, was editor of the psychoanalysis journal American Imago.

Publications

Books 
 Richard Dehmel: Der Mensch und der Denker (Dresden, 1928)
 Three Ways of Modern Man (New York, 1937)
 Thomas Mann's Joseph Story: An Interpretation (New York, 1938)
 No Voice Is Wholly Lost (New York, 1945)
 Mythopoesis: Mythic Patterns in the Literary Classics (Detroit: Wayne State University Press, 1970)

References

External links 
 Harry Slochower discusses "Philosophical Principles in Freudian Psychoanalytic Theory, Ontology, and the Quest for Matrem" on WNYC 
Publications of Harry Slochower 

1900 births
1991 deaths
Bukovina Jews
20th-century American male writers
20th-century American philosophers
20th-century Austrian male writers
20th-century Austrian philosophers
City College of New York alumni
Columbia University alumni
Jewish philosophers
Jewish psychoanalysts
Jewish scholars
Austrian emigrants to the United States